Chad C. Finchum (born September 22, 1994) is an American professional stock car racing driver. He last competed part-time in the NASCAR Xfinity Series, driving the No. 13 Toyota Supra for MBM Motorsports. Finchum has also driven several races in the NASCAR K&N Pro Series East, capturing a victory at Bristol Motor Speedway in that series, and in the NASCAR Cup Series.

Racing career

Early years
Finchum began racing at age seven, starting his career racing go-karts at Dumplin Valley Raceway in Tennessee. By age 13 he had logged 200 go-kart wins on dirt and asphalt. He then moved to full-bodied cars, often racing late models at Kingsport Speedway in Tennessee, and also competed in Bandolero and Legends cars in Charlotte Motor Speedway's Summer Shootout. He would win the Tennessee NASCAR Whelen All-American Series championship in 2010.

Finchum graduated from Halls High School (Knox County, Tennessee)

K&N Pro Series East
Finchum drove his first four K&N Pro Series East races in 2011 with Lori Williams, who had given Daniel Suárez and Jesus Hernandez rides previously. Finchum scored two top-ten finishes that first year, finishing seventh at Bowman Gray Stadium and Gresham Motorsports Park. He joined Spraker Racing in 2012, finishing seventh again at Bristol Motor Speedway but not finding success in his other three starts. One start with Spraker in 2013 yielded a DNF at Bristol. Finchum then started 2015 driving for his own team but then associated with Martin-McClure Racing later in the year. In only his third start with the team, and his first in 2016, Finchum won the K&N race at Bristol. Starting from the fourth position, Finchum passed polesitter and leader Harrison Burton thirteen laps into the race and never looked back. In a late restart Finchum held off future NASCAR national series drivers Kyle Benjamin, Justin Haley, Kaz Grala and Todd Gilliland. Focusing on the Xfinity Series in 2017, Finchum ran one K&N race, recording a fifth at Bristol.

Xfinity Series

Finchum, in conjunction with his K&N Pro Series East team Team McClure Inc., signed on for two races with MBM Motorsports including a debut race at Dover International Speedway. Despite falling out with engine problems at Dover, Finchum was approved for 1.5-mile tracks, yielding another start at Kentucky Speedway. Finchum made five more starts in 2017 ranging from 1-mile Dover to 2.5-mile Indianapolis Motor Speedway, cracking the top thirty three times.

In late November 2017, Finchum was announced as the full-time driver of MBM's No. 40 entry for the 2018 NASCAR Xfinity Series season. He led second practice at Daytona International Speedway in July. He finished the year 30th in final point standings.

In 2019, Finchum surprisingly qualified 2nd for both the Rinnai 250 and the Boyd Gaming 300 after rain cancelled qualifying. That season he ran nearly full time, only missing Daytona being run by Johnny Jackson.

Cup Series
On March 27, 2018, Finchum announced in a Bristol Motor Speedway promotional video that he would make his Monster Energy NASCAR Cup Series debut at that track in April 2018. The run came in the No. 66 car for MBM Motorsports, whom he also drives for in the NASCAR Xfinity Series. Bristol was a track that Finchum was especially excited to make his debut at, as he considers it a "home track". After starting 38th, he finished 33rd when he retired from the race on lap 335.

Finchum failed to qualify for the 2020 Daytona 500 after finishing 20th in Duel 1 of the 2020 Bluegreen Vacations Duels. In September, he ran the South Point 400 at Las Vegas Motor Speedway, finishing last when overheating ended his day after 19 laps. He also competed at Kansas and Texas, where he respectively finished 39th and 35th.

He was due to return to the Daytona 500 the following year in the No. 13 for MBM (previously the No. 49), but was replaced by Garrett Smithley. He's due to running the Ally 400 with the 66, his debut number in 2018.

Motorsports career results

NASCAR
(key) (Bold – Pole position awarded by qualifying time. Italics – Pole position earned by points standings or practice time. * – Most laps led.)

Cup Series

Daytona 500

Xfinity Series

K&N Pro Series East

 Season still in progress
 Ineligible for series points

References

External links
 
 
 

Living people
1994 births
Sportspeople from Knoxville, Tennessee
Racing drivers from Tennessee
NASCAR drivers
Halls High School (Knox County, Tennessee) alumni